Marc Cantin (1933–1990) was a Canadian Québécois doctor and professor.  His studies were completed at Laval University in Quebec and at the University of Chicago.  He was a professor at the University of Montreal and at McGill University and worked with the doctor Hans Selye.  In 1980, he began to direct the hypertension research group at the Institute of clinical research at Montreal, Quebec, Canada.

Honours/Awards

 1984 - Winner of the Prix Marcel-Piché
 1986 - Winner of the Prix Léo-Pariseau
 Research Achievement Award from the American Heart Association, in conjunction with doctor P. Needleman
 Rue Marc-Cantin in Montreal has honoured his memory since 1992.
 site Web in Montreal marccantin.com.

Université Laval alumni
University of Chicago alumni
1933 births
1990 deaths
Academic staff of the Université de Montréal
Academic staff of McGill University
Physicians from Quebec
Academics from Quebec